K'usill Willk'i (Aymara k'usillu monkey, willk'i gap, "monkey gap", also spelled Khusill Willkhi, Khuzill Willkhi) is a mountain in the Bolivian Andes which reaches a height of approximately . It is located in the La Paz Department, Sud Yungas Province, Irupana Municipality. K'usill Willk'i lies northeast of Jukumarini.

References 

Mountains of La Paz Department (Bolivia)